Jurkowski (feminine: Jurkowska; plural: Jurkowscy) is a Polish-language surname which appears in different forms in other countries.

People 
Katarzyna Jurkowska-Kowalska (born 1992), Polish artistic gymnast
Kenneth Jurkowski (born 1981), American rower
Ryszard Jurkowski (born 1945), Polish architect and urban planner
Maria Fyodorovna Andreyeva, stage name of Maria Fyodorovna Yurkovskaya (1868–1953), Russian actress and Bolshevik administrator
Robert Jurkowski (born 1980), Electronics Engineer

See also
 

Polish-language surnames